Shannon Bogues (born February 20, 1997) is an American professional basketball player for Apollon Limassol B.C. of the Cyprus Basketball Division A. He played college basketball for the McLennan Highlanders and the Stephen F. Austin Lumberjacks.

Early life and high school career
Bogues began focusing only on basketball in eighth grade. He attended Ellison High School in Killeen, Texas. As a senior, Bogues was named District 12-6A Offensive Player of the Year. He committed to McLennan Community College.

College career
Bogues averaged 16.1 points, 3.7 rebounds and  2.9 assists per game as a freshman at McLennan. He led the Highlanders to the school's first trip to the NJCAA National Tournament since 1998 and earned the NTJCAC Freshman of the Year award as well as being a first-team all-conference pick. As a sophomore, Bogues averaged 18.8 points, 4.6 rebounds and 3.8 assists per game. He was named Northern Texas Junior College Athletic Conference Player of the Year. Bogues was a NJCAA Region V All-Region selection and an NJCAA Honorable Mention All-American, and earned MVP honors of the NJCAA Men's Basketball Coaches Association All-Star Game after scoring 16 points. He committed to transfer to Stephen F. Austin.

On February 10, 2018, he scored a career-high 35 points in a 97–50 win against Northwestern State. Bogues averaged 15.4 points and 2.4 rebounds per game as a junior and was named to the Second Team All-Southland Conference. He helped Stephen F. Austin reach the NCAA tournament, where they lost to Texas Tech 70–60 despite 14 points from Bogues. As a senior, Bogues averaged 17.9 points, 3.0 rebounds, 3.6 assists, and 1.2 steals per game, earning Second Team All-Southland honors. He finished his career at Stephen F. Austin with 1,075 points.

Professional career
After going undrafted in the 2019 NBA Draft, Bogues joined the Phoenix Suns for the NBA Summer League but was cut before the first game. He began his professional career in with the Wisconsin Herd, after they selected him in the second round of the 2019 NBA G League draft. He averaged 10 points, 2.5 rebounds, and 2.0 assists per game. 

On July 11, 2020, Bogues signed with Niners Chemnitz of the German ProA. However, he parted ways with the team in the preseason and signed with GTK Gliwice of the Polish Basketball League on November 20, 2020. Bogues averaged 10.6 points per game. 

On October 21, 2021, he was acquired by the Capital City Go-Go. Bogues was waived on February 1, 2022. He averaged 3.1 points and 1.4 rebounds per game. 

On February 17, 2022, Bogues signed with  Apollon Limassol B.C. of the Cyprus Basketball Division A.

Personal life
Bogues is the son of Shannon Bogues Sr. His brother Shamir plays basketball at Tarleton State.

References

External links
Stephen F. Austin Lumberjacks bio

1997 births
Living people
American men's basketball players
American expatriate basketball people in Poland
Basketball players from Texas
Capital City Go-Go players
McLennan Community College alumni
Shooting guards
Stephen F. Austin Lumberjacks basketball players
People from Killeen, Texas
Wisconsin Herd players